The men's 100 metres at the 2013 IPC Athletics World Championships was held at the Stade du Rhône from 20–29 July.

Medalists

Results

T11
Round 1

Semifinals

Final

T12

T13

T34

T35

T36

T37

T38

T42

T44

T46

T51

T52

T53

T54

See also
List of IPC world records in athletics

References

100 metres
100 metres at the World Para Athletics Championships